Pierre-Henri Bunel (born 1952) is a former French artillery and intelligence officer. He became publicly known after having leaked sensitive NATO documents during the Kosovo war, for which he served a jail sentence in 2001–2002. He later worked in construction and as a writer on Islamic extremism and the Serbian War.

Career
After graduating from the prestigious military academy of Saint-Cyr, he entered the French Army in 1972 and obtained the rank of major.  During the Gulf War, he was an aide to General Michel Roquejeoffre.

Leaking of sensitive NATO operational documents
At the end of 1998, when he was a member of the French delegation to NATO's military committee at the headquarters in Brussels, he admitted of having passed sensitive operational documents to Serbian officials, after which he was accused of treason. He admitted of having passed these documents between July and October 1998 to Serbian colonel Jovan Milanović. Documents indicated the future strikes in Serbia during the Kosovo War. While newspapers alleged a traditional pro-Serb bias in the French military, he claimed to be acting under orders of French intelligence services with the object of convincing the sceptical Serb government that the NATO threat of bombing was real, but change his story claiming that he did it because of personal reasons, mainly hatred toward United States. On 15 December 2001 he was condemned by a military tribunal, demoted in rank and sentenced to five years in prison. Three years were suspended, he was freed from La Santé Prison in the Spring of 2002.

When asking for a five-year term for Bunel, state prosecutor Janine Stern said at the tribunal:

9/11 attacks and publishing
In 2002, he collaborated in the book by Thierry Meyssan, Le Pentagate, for which he wrote chapter 4 entitled "The effect of a shaped charge." The book disputes the official version of the attack on the Pentagon in 2001 and alleges that the attack was made by a missile.

He has also translated into French the works of David Ray Griffin, a philosopher of religion and philosophy, who contests the official version of the September 11 attacks.

Works
Crimes de guerre à l'OTAN, Éditions n°1, 2000 ; complété et réédité chez Carnot, en 2001.
Mes services secrets : Souvenirs d'un agent de l'ombre, Flammarion, 2001.
Menaces islamistes, Carnot, 2001.
Proche-Orient : Une guerre mondiale, Carnot, 2004.
Le Cederom Montsegur Roman cryptographique, éditions ACE, 2004.

References

Sources
Jean Chichizola, "Pierre-Henri Bunel, l'espion français dans les Balkans" Le Figaro 14 October 2007
"French major jailed as Serb spy" BBC News. 12 December 2001
Stephen Jessel, "French officer 'spied for Serbs'", BBC News. November 2, 1998
"French Nato spy faces treason trial" BBC News. 19 October 2001

1952 births
Living people
French Army officers
French spies
French prisoners and detainees
Prisoners and detainees of France
French autobiographers
French male non-fiction writers